30:e november is a Swedish film released to cinemas in Sweden on 10 March 1995.

Plot
The plot starts with Adam and a gang of white power skinheads setting a reception center for asylum-seekers on fire. One of those fleeing the center is Julia from Peru, and for Adam, it is love at first sight. Despite the title of the film, it takes place in the middle of summer, around the National Day of Sweden, 6 June. However, 30 November is a date when Swedish neo-Nazis have often organized marches commemorating King Charles XII.

About the film
The film has since aired on Sveriges Television and TV4, and was released on video in September 1995. The TV and video versions run at 111 minutes. It is a reinterpretation of Romeo and Juliet, mostly scene for scene.

References

External links

Swedish drama films
1995 films
Films shot in Sweden
Films directed by Daniel Fridell
Films based on Romeo and Juliet
1990s Swedish films